Petrak or Petrák is a surname derived form the given name Peter. Notable people with the surname include:

Bernard Petrák, Slovak footballer
Franz Petrak, Austrian-Czech mycologist
Oliver Petrak, Croatian footballer
Ondřej Petrák, Czech footballer
Tomislav Petrak